Jock O'Brien (24 January 1909 – 14 March 1985) was an Australian rules footballer who played with Essendon in the Victorian Football League (VFL).

O'Brien played his junior football for Essendon but was recruited from Williamstown. He was used as wingman and rover. He won the award for Essendon's "best first year player" in 1932 but after two more seasons had to retire, due to work commitments.

He was the elder brother of North Melbourne captain Dally O'Brien.

References

1909 births
Australian rules footballers from Victoria (Australia)
Essendon Football Club players
Williamstown Football Club players
1985 deaths